Your Body Above Me is the debut album by the alternative rock band Black Lab. Released on Geffen Records on October 21, 1997, it featured two US radio hits, "Wash it Away" and "Time Ago." The album was also simultaneously released as a three-sided vinyl LP with a press of the album artwork on the fourth side. It was released outside of America in January 1998.

The band split with Geffen in 1999, and in October 2006, lead singer Paul Durham announced that the album would be re-released  as Your Body Above Me: The Director's Cut, with an alternate track listing and two bonus tracks, as well as two minutes of additional music cut from the original tracks.

Original track listing

Re-release track listing

References

1997 debut albums
Black Lab albums
Geffen Records albums